The Lanikaz was a Turkic tribe or clan. They were one of seven original tribes that made up the Kimek confederation. They originated from the Central Asian steppes.

The Lanikaz were one of seven original tribes that made up the Kimek confederation, along with the Imur/Imi, Imak Tatar, Kipchak, Bayandur, and Ajlad. The Kimek tribes originated in the Central Asian steppes and had migrated to the territory of present-day Kazakhstan. The Lanikaz, as part of the Kimek, were mentioned by Gardizi. Their ethnonym may be derived from alan-i-kaz(ar) meaning "Khazar Alans". V. F. Minorsky rendered the name as Nilkaz, S. Agajanov as Nilkar. S. M. Akhindjanov connected the name Nilkaz to the Nilkan clan of the Mongolian tribe of Djalayir. S. Divitçioğlu rendered it Nilqas.

Y. Zuev calls the spelling "Lanikaz" an 'obviously distorted name of the Kimek tribe in the Gardizi list', and corrects it to Laktan, which Zuev further links to Middle Chinese 駱駝 *lɑk̚  dɑ "camel". The location of the Kimek Laktan 落坦 (Luotan < MC: *lɑk̚-tʰɑnX), before the Kimek's return to the area of Black Irtysh, in the Chinese annals is described as east from the lake Külün on the northern left bank of the river Argun. Zuev observes that Chinese annals contain a 'number of messages about congratulatory visits of Kimeks-Laktans to Chang'an, attesting to the political importance of this tribe. They do not contain any other information.'

Note

References

Sources
 Zuev Yu.A., "Early Türks: Essays on history and ideology", Almaty, Daik-Press, 2002,  (In Russian)
 
 
 Pletneva S.A., "Kipchaks", Moscow, "Science", 1990, p. 74, 
Kimball L., "The Vanished Kimak Empire", Western Washington U., 1994, pp. 371–373

Turkic peoples of Asia
Kimek confederation
Extinct Turkic peoples